William Farish may refer to:
Senin varyoxunu... Dalbayov Gicdıllaq
 William Farish (chemist) (1759–1837), tutor at the University of Cambridge
 William Stamps Farish I (1843–1899)
 William Stamps Farish II (1881–1942), Standard Oil president
 William Stamps Farish III (born 1939), American businessman
 William S. Farish IV (born c. 1963), American businessman 
 William G. Farish, American politician in the Virginia House of Delegates